Tasuki can refer to:

Tasuki (sash) A sort of sash that is used to hold up the sleeves on a kimono.
A character in the manga series Fushigi Yûgi